This is a list of notable people who were born in or near, or have been residents of Ilkley, England.

 Donald Baverstock (1924–1995), TV executive (former resident)
 Gillian Baverstock (1931–2007), writer and daughter of Enid Blyton (former resident)
 Martyn Bedford, novelist
 Gordon J. Brand, professional golfer
 Don Brennan (deceased), England cricketer
 Jilly Cooper, novelist (former resident)
 John Cunliffe, children's novelist and television (deceased) presenter
 John Gordon Dower, architect and leading light to create the National Parks of England and Wales
 Jeremy Dyson, author, musician and screenwriter
 Anthony Earnshaw (deceased), anarchist and surrealist author and illustrator
 Anita Ganeri, author
 Gomez, British rock band (resident during the production of their Mercury Music Prize-winning album Bring It On)
 Georgie Henley, actress
 Kim-Joy Hewlett, baker and cookbook author
 The Rt Revd. and Rt Hon. David Hope, Baron Hope of Thornes (formerly Archbishop of York)
 Clive Hornby, actor
 Tom Jackson (deceased), trade unionist
 Mark James, professional golfer
 Pat Kirkwood (deceased), musical theatre actress, lived and died at Glen Rosa, Kitwood House 
 Marie Walker Last 1917-2017 artist 
 Sir Edward Maufe (deceased), architect
 Albert Modley (deceased), comedian
 Colin Montgomerie, professional golfer (former resident)
 Alan Silson, musician and lead guitarist of rock band Smokie
 Thomas Bowman Stephenson, Methodist minister and founder of National Children's Home
 Alan Titchmarsh, celebrity gardener (former resident)
 Catherine Tolson (1892–1924), English nurse and suffragette 
 Donald Wade, Baron Wade (deceased), Liberal Party Member of Parliament
 Richard Whiteley (deceased), television presenter and journalist
 Ricky Wilson, lead singer of rock band Kaiser Chiefs (former resident)
 Arthur Wood (deceased), England cricketer

References 

 
Ilkley